According to the Porter hypothesis, strict environmental regulations can induce efficiency and encourage innovations that help improve commercial competitiveness. The hypothesis was formulated by the economist Michael Porter in an article in 1991.

The hypothesis suggests that strict environmental regulation triggers the discovery and introduction of cleaner technologies and environmental improvements, the innovation effect, making production processes and products more efficient. The cost savings that can be achieved are sufficient to overcompensate for both the compliance costs directly attributed to new regulations and the innovation costs.

In the first mover advantage, a company is able to exploit innovation by learning curve effects or patenting and attains a dominating competitive position compared to companies in countries where environmental regulations were enforced much later.

The Porter hypothesis has been applied to REACH. In one conclusion, companies that adopt a cost leadership business strategy and have a relatively small product portfolio will fare better than companies that compete by product differentiation and have a larger number of chemicals that require regulation.

Various studies found that stricter environmental regulation stimulates innovation ("weak" version of Porter hypothesis). There is mixed evidence whether stricter regulation enhances business performance ("strong" version). Whether the type of regulation - market-based approaches or requirements and prohibitions - has an impact, is an open question. Economic theory suggests that market based instruments could be more efficient but there is mixed empirical evidence. A study of OECD countries, however, showed no evidence of permanent effects of environmental policy tightening on productivity following the introduction of environmental measures, regardless of the type of regulation.

References

Further reading
 Michael E. Porter and Claas van der Linde, "Toward a New Conception of the Environment-Competitiveness Relationship," Journal of Economic Perspectives, Vol. 9, No. 4 (Autumn, 1995), pp. 97–118 (JSTOR).
 Michael E. Porter and Claas van der Linde, "Green and Competitive" Harvard Business Review (Sept-October 1995), p 120–134.

Competition (economics)
Environmental economics
Environmental social science concepts